Ginger and Fred is a 1986 comedy/drama film directed and written by Federico Fellini and starring Marcello Mastroianni and Giulietta Masina.

The title is a reference to the American dancing couple Fred Astaire and Ginger Rogers. The two leads portray Italian impersonators of Astaire and Rogers who reunite after thirty years of retirement for a vulgar and bizarre television extravaganza.

The film was the subject of a trademark claim in the United States by Ginger Rogers, who claimed in Rogers v. Grimaldi that the film violated her Lanham Act trademark rights, right of publicity, and was a "false light" defamation.  The Second Circuit rejected this claim, finding that "suppressing an artistically relevant though ambiguous[ly] title[d] film" on trademark grounds would "unduly restrict expression."

Plot
Amelia and Pippo were once together famous as dancers, imitating Ginger Rogers' and Fred Astaire's dance routines. Thirty years after they've retired, they team up one more time for a live TV show. Although this reunion is overshadowed by Pippo's lack of stamina, their performance is well-received and revives their popularity for another day.

Cast
 Giulietta Masina as Amelia Bonetti (Ginger)
 Marcello Mastroianni as Pippo Botticella (Fred)
 Franco Fabrizi as Show host
 Friedrich von Ledebur as Admiral Aulenti
 Augusto Poderosi as transvestite
 Martin Maria Blau as assistant director
 Jacques Henri Lartigue as Brother Gerolamo
 Totò Mignone as Totò
 Ezio Marano as the intellectual
 Antoine Saint-John as bandaged man
 Friedrich von Thun as kidnapped tycoon
 Antonino Iuorio as TV inspector
 Barbara Scoppa as journalist
 Elisabetta Flumeri as journalist
 Salvatore Billa as Clark Gable
 Caterina Vertova

Reception
Ginger and Fred was nominated for best foreign film awards in 1986 by the U.S. National Board of Review of Motion Pictures, as well as the 1987 Golden Globes and BAFTA. Masina received a  David di Donatello for Best Actress award for her role (1986).

See also 
 Rogers v. Grimaldi

References

External links 

 
 
 
 

1986 films
Italian satirical films
Films directed by Federico Fellini
Films about television
Films about entertainers
Cultural depictions of Fred Astaire
1980s Italian-language films
Films set in Rome
Metro-Goldwyn-Mayer films
1986 comedy-drama films
Italian comedy-drama films
Films with screenplays by Federico Fellini
Films with screenplays by Tonino Guerra
Films produced by Alberto Grimaldi
Transgender-related films
Italian dance films
1980s dance films
1986 drama films
1986 comedy films
Films scored by Nicola Piovani
1980s Italian films